Moonchild or Moon child may refer to:

Film
 Moonchild (1974 film), an American horror film
 Moon Child (1989 film), a Spanish film
 Moon Child (2003 film), a Japanese film starring Gackt and Hyde

Music

Artists
 MC the Max, also known as Moon Child, K-pop band
 Moonchild (band), an alternative R&B band
 Moonchild Sanelly, South African electronic artist and pioneer of future ghetto punk

Albums
 Moonchild: Songs Without Words, by John Zorn
 Moon Child (Johnny Lytle album)
 Moon Child (Pharoah Sanders album)
 Moonchild (Celtus album) (1997)
 Moonchild (Charlene Soraia album)
 Moonchild (NIKI album) (2020)
 Moonchild Mixes (2022), album by Selena

Songs
 "Moonchild", a song by Captain Beefheart and His Magic Band (1966)
 "Moonchild" (King Crimson song) (1969)
 "Moonchild", a song by blues songwriter Rory Gallagher from the album Calling Card (1976)
 "Moonchild", a song by Rick James from the album Glow (1985)
 "Moonchild", a song by Fields of the Nephilim from the album The Nephilim (1988)
 "Moonchild", a song by Iron Maiden from the album Seventh Son of a Seventh Son (1988)
 "Moonchild", a song by Deborah Gibson from the album Deborah (1996)
 "Moonchild", a song by Chris Cornell from the album Euphoria Morning (1999)
 "Moonchild" (Cibo Matto song) (1999)
 "Moonchild", a song by M83 from the album Before the Dawn Heals Us (2005)
 "Moonchild", a song by rapper RM from the album Mono (2018)

Other uses
 Someone whose astrological sign is Cancer
 Moonchild (novel), a 1917 novel by the British occultist Aleister Crowley
 Moon Child (manga), a 1989 manga series by Reiko Shimizu
 Another name for the Childlike Empress, a character in the 1979 children's book The Neverending Story

See also
 A Moon Child in the Sky, a 2005 album by Tsukiko Amano